Aída Nabila Román Arroyo (born May 21, 1988) is a Mexican archer. A three-time Olympian, she won silver medal in the women's individual event at the 2012 Summer Olympics and was the women's World Indoor Archery Champion in 2014. She has additionally achieved medal finishes at the World Archery Championships, Archery World Cup, and Pan American Games.

Career

2007–2011: Continental successes and Olympic debut
Román first won selection to the Mexico national team in 2007 when she was chosen to compete in that year's Pan American Games, where she won a silver medal.

Román made her Olympic debut at the 2008 Summer Olympics in Beijing, contesting the women's individual event as one of two Mexicans in the field alongside Mariana Avitia. Román finished the event's 72-arrow ranking round with a total score of 646 points, earning the 12th seed for the subsequent knock-out rounds. Following victories over Veronique D'Unienville of Mauritius and Viktoriya Koval of Ukraine in the first two elimination rounds, she was defeated by North Korea's Kwon Un-Sil in the third round after scoring poorly in the final quarter of the 12-arrow contest. Speaking with the media following her loss a tearful Román was unable to explain her drop in accuracy, though in an interview four years later she reflected that she had lacked the mental strength to handle the pressure of competing for a spot in the quarter-finals.

Román was the most decorated female athlete at the 2010 Central American Games, winning seven gold medals and one silver medal. The following year she triumphed alongside Mariana Avitia and Alejandra Valencia at the 2011 Pan American Games, winning Mexico's first gold medal in the women's team event.

2012: Olympic silver medalist

Román was selected to compete at the 2012 Summer Olympics in London, entering both the women's individual and women's team events with Avitia and Valencia. After scoring 658 points in the 72-arrow ranking round Román was seeded eleventh for the elimination rounds of the individual event, and her score combined with those of Avitia and Valencia earned Mexico the fourth seed for the team competition.

Although Román and her teammates were eliminated from the team event at the quarter-final stage by Japan, she made steady progress in the individual event, winning her first four matches to set up a semi-final against Avitia, who had delivered an upset against South Korea's Lee Sung-jin in the quarter-finals. Their encounter ensured Mexico its first Olympic archery medal with the winner guaranteed at least a silver medal by contesting the final. Román defeated her younger teammate to win by six set points to four, setting up a tie with in the gold medal match with Lee's compatriot Ki Bo-bae.

The gold medal final between Román and Ki was a close match, and after five sets the pair were tied, necessitating a one-arrow shoot-off. Ki matched Román in shooting into the 8-ring of the target, but the South Korean's arrow was determined to be marginally closer to the centre of the target, earning her the gold medal. With Avitia's earlier bronze medal success in the third-place playoff match, Román's silver medal marked the first time since the 1984 Summer Olympics that Mexican athletes had shared the podium in any Olympic discipline and the first time ever that it had been achieved by Mexican women.

2016 Summer Olympics
At the 2016 Summer Olympics, Román reached the second round of the individual event and was on the Mexican team that reached the quarterfinals.

In 2021, she won the silver medal in the women's team event at the 2021 World Archery Championships held in Yankton, United States.

Individual performance timeline

References

External links
 

1988 births
Living people
Olympic archers of Mexico
Archers at the 2008 Summer Olympics
Archers at the 2011 Pan American Games
Archers at the 2012 Summer Olympics
Archers at the 2016 Summer Olympics
Mexican female archers
Sportspeople from Mexico City
Olympic silver medalists for Mexico
Olympic medalists in archery
Medalists at the 2012 Summer Olympics
World Archery Championships medalists
Pan American Games gold medalists for Mexico
Pan American Games silver medalists for Mexico
Pan American Games bronze medalists for Mexico
Pan American Games medalists in archery
Archers at the 2015 Pan American Games
Central American and Caribbean Games gold medalists for Mexico
Central American and Caribbean Games bronze medalists for Mexico
Competitors at the 2018 Central American and Caribbean Games
Archers at the 2019 Pan American Games
Central American and Caribbean Games medalists in archery
Medalists at the 2019 Pan American Games
Medalists at the 2011 Pan American Games
Medalists at the 2015 Pan American Games
Archers at the 2020 Summer Olympics
20th-century Mexican women
21st-century Mexican women